In the earliest prehistoric period Astłik had been worshipped as the Armenian deity of fertility and love, later the skylight had been considered her personification, and she had been the consort of Vahagn. In the later heathen period she became the goddess of love, maidenly beauty, and water sources and springs.

The Vardavar festival devoted to Astłik that had once been celebrated in mid July was transformed into the Christian holiday of the Transfiguration of Jesus, and is still celebrated by the Armenians.  As in pre-Christian times, on the day of this fest the people release doves and sprinkle water on each other with wishes of health and good luck.

One tradition holds her as Noah's daughter, born after the great flood.

Mythology
Astłik was originally the goddess creator of heaven and earth, and was later demoted to the position of "maiden". This change in the pantheon occurred as Aramazd became creator and Anahit became known as Great Lady and Mother Deity (the moon being worshipped as her personification). They form a trinity in the pantheon of Armenian deities. In the period of Hellenistic influence, Astłik became similar to the Greek Aphrodite and the Mesopotamian Ishtar.

Etymology
Her name is the diminutive of Armenian  , meaning "star". All star goddesses were originally called night goddesses, including the morning and evening star (Venus).

Cultic locales
Her principal seat was in Ashtishat (Taron), located to the North from Muş, where her chamber was dedicated to the name of Vahagn and known as "Vahagn's bedroom". Vahagn was the personification of a sun-god, her lover or husband according to popular tales.

Other temples and places of worship of Astłik had been located in various towns and villages, such as the mountain of Palaty (to the South-West from Lake Van), in Artamet (12 km from Van), etc.

The unique monuments of prehistoric Armenia, vishap ("dragon stones") spread in many provinces of historical Armenia (i.e., Gegharkunik, Aragatsotn, Javakhk, Tayk, etc.), and are additional manifestations of her worship.

See also 

 Armenian mythology
 Armenian Native Faith
 Anahit
 Aramazd
 Hayk
 Ishtar
 Vahagn

Footnotes

References

Bibliography 

Armenian goddesses
Fertility goddesses
Love and lust goddesses
Sea and river goddesses
Harvest goddesses